Primordial Domination is the seventh studio album by the American death metal band Incantation. The album was released in 2006.

Track listing
All Music by John McEntee & Kyle Severn.  All Lyrics as Noted.

Personnel
John McEntee: Guitars, Vocals
Joe Lombard: Bass
Kyle Severn: Drums

Production
Produced by Bill Korecky & Incantation
Recorded & Mixed by Bill Korecky at Mars Recording Compound
Mastered by Alan Douches & Kim Dumas at West West Side Music.

References

Incantation (band) albums
2006 albums
Megaforce Records albums
Listenable Records albums